The Acoustic Album is a 2-disc compilation album released by EMI/Virgin Records in July 2006 to showcase songs heard on Virgin Radio.

Track listing
Disc 1:
Jack Johnson – "Breakdown"
Corinne Bailey Rae – "Put Your Records On"
KT Tunstall – "Other Side of the World"
Keane – "Somewhere Only We Know"
The Feeling – "Sewn"
Snow Patrol – "Run"
Athlete – "Wires"
Coldplay – "Fix You"
Breaks Co-Op – "The Otherside"
Stephen Fretwell – "Emily"
Ryan Adams – "Wonderwall" (originally by Oasis)
Nick Drake – "Time Has Told Me"
Paul Weller – "Wild Wood"
Radiohead – "Fake Plastic Trees"
Richard Ashcroft – "Break the Night With Colour"
The Thrills – "Santa Cruz"
Supergrass – "St. Petersburg"
Air – "All I Need"
Doves – "Willow's Song"
Blur – "To the End"

Disc 2:
José González – "Heartbeats"
Katie Melua – "Nine Million Bicycles"
Eva Cassidy – "Fields of Gold"
Paul McCartney & Wings – "Bluebird"
Cat Stevens – "Moon Shadow"
Suzanne Vega – "Marlene on the Wall"
Crowded House – "Weather With You"
Oasis – "Songbird"
The Kooks – "She Moves in Her Own Way"
Turin Brakes – "Pain Killer" 
Ben Harper – "Diamonds on the Inside"
Animal Liberation Orchestra – "Girl I Wanna Lay You Down"
Rufus Wainwright – "California"
Richard Hawley – "Just Like the Rain"
Fred Neil – "Everybody's Talkin'"
Kings of Convenience – "I Don't Know What I Can Save You From"
Norah Jones – "Come Away With Me"
Joss Stone – "Fell in Love With a Boy" (a cover of The White Stripes' "Fell in Love With a Girl")
Donavon Frankenreiter – "It Don't Matter"
Bernard Fanning – "Wish You Well"
Matt Costa – "Cold December"
R.E.M. – "The One I Love" (Live)
Nizlopi – "JCB Song"

References

2006 compilation albums